Finsch's bulbul (Iole finschii) is a species of songbird in the bulbul family, Pycnonotidae. It is found on the Malay Peninsula, Sumatra, and Borneo. Its natural habitat is subtropical or tropical moist lowland forests.  It is threatened by habitat loss.

Taxonomy and systematics
Finsch's bulbul was originally described in the genus Criniger, moved to the genus Alophoixus in 2009, and to genus Iole in 2020. Alternate names for Finsch's bulbul include the dwarf bearded bulbul, dwarf bulbul and Finsch's bearded bulbul. The common name and scientific name commemorate the German ethnographer, naturalist and colonial explorer Friedrich Hermann Otto Finsch.

References

Finsch's bulbul
Birds of Malesia
Finsch's bulbul
Taxonomy articles created by Polbot